Agathotoma coxi is a species of sea snail, a marine gastropod mollusk in the family Mangeliidae.

References

 Fargo, W. G. 1953. Pliocene Mollusca of Southern Florida. Part II. The Pliocene Turridae of Saint Petersburg, Florida Monographs of the Academy of Natural Sciences of Philadelphia 18 365-409, pls. 16-24
 Rolán E., Fernández-Garcés E. & Redfern C. (2012) New records and description of four new species of the genus Agathotoma (Gastropoda, Mangeliidae) in the Caribbean. Novapex 13(2): 45-62

coxi
Gastropods described in 1953